Eddie Carl Nealy (born February 19, 1960) is an American retired basketball player. At 6'7" and 238 pounds, he played as a power forward. After a standout college career, during which he won the Big Eight tournament title in 1980, he went on to play professionally for 11 years. During his professional career, he won the Continental Basketball Association championship in 1986 as a member of the Tampa Bay Thrillers and the NBA championship in 1993 as a member of the Chicago Bulls.

College career
Born in Pittsburg, Kansas, Nealy attended Kansas State University. Although he was not expected to be a factor for the Wildcats as a freshman, he started 30 of the team's 31 games, averaging 10.2 points and team leading 8.2 rebounds per game en route to Big Eight Newcomer of the Year honors. During his sophomore season, he was a vital part in helping the team win the 1980 Big Eight tournament championship and reach the Elite Eight of the 1980 NCAA Tournament after averaging 9.8 points and 8.8 rebounds per game. As a junior, he averaged 11.0 points and 9.1 rebounds, helping the Wildcats reach the West Regional Finals. During his senior season, he averaged 11.3 points and 8.7 rebounds per game, and led the Wildcats to Sweet 16 of the NCAA Tournament and earned first team All-Big Eight and honorable mention All-America honors.

Professional career
After his college career ended, Nealy was selected by the Kansas City Kings in the eighth round of the 1982 NBA draft. In 10 NBA seasons with the Kings, San Antonio Spurs, Chicago Bulls, Phoenix Suns and Golden State Warriors, Nealy averaged 2.7 points and 3.3 rebounds.

Nealy played two seasons in the Continental Basketball Association, averaging 9.8 points and 10.0 rebounds in 68 games. During the 1986 playoffs, he averaged 12.9 points and 15.5 rebounds for the Tampa Bay Thrillers, helping them to the CBA championship.

During his multiple stints in Chicago, Nealy became a fan-favorite (and a favorite of coach Phil Jackson) for his hustle and hard work ethic, especially during the 1990 NBA playoffs during stints where Scottie Pippen and Bill Cartwright were injured or struggling during the game. During his last season, Nealy was a late addition to the Chicago Bulls team which won the 1993 NBA Championship, although he did not play during the playoffs. He retired following the finals.

Player profile
Due to his hustle, aggressiveness and court smarts, Nealy received positive feedback for his unselfish play and willingness to be physical throughout his career.

During Nealy's college playing career, Dean Smith, head coach of the North Carolina Tar Heels at the time, said about Nealy in anticipation of the Elite Eight game his team would play against Nealy's Kansas State Wildcats, "With some players, a rebound hits their hand and bounces off. Nealy catches it. He has hands like Bobby Jones and Adrian Dantley. He is going to be a great pro some day. I truly mean that."

Phil Jackson, who coached Nealy while he played for the Bulls in the 1989-90 and 1992-93 seasons, remarked, "It's guys like Ed who make coaching a pleasure. If you give me a reason to put him into a game, he's going to find a way to contribute." The book The Jordan Rules features Phil Jackson labelling Nealy as his "favorite player, smartest player on the team."

Personal life
Nealy's son, Spencer, played football at Texas A&M University.

Career statistics

NBA

Source

Regular season

|-
|style="text-align:left;"|
|style="text-align:left;"|Kansas City
|82||61||20.0||.595||–||.614||5.9||.8||.8||.1||4.4
|-
|style="text-align:left;"|
|style="text-align:left;"|Kansas City
|71||1||13.5||.500||–||.800||3.1||.7||.6||.1||2.5
|-
|style="text-align:left;"|
|style="text-align:left;"|Kansas City
|22||0||10.1||.591||–||.526||2.0||.8||.1||.0||2.8
|-
|style="text-align:left;"|
|style="text-align:left;"|San Antonio
|60||7||16.3||.438||.129||.739||4.7||1.4||.7||.2||3.7
|-
|style="text-align:left;"|
|style="text-align:left;"|San Antonio
|68||1||12.3||.459||.500||.651||3.3||.7||.4||.1||2.1
|-
|style="text-align:left;"|
|style="text-align:left;"|Chicago
|13||0||7.2||.714||–||.500||1.8||.5||.2||.1||.8
|-
|style="text-align:left;"|
|style="text-align:left;"|Phoenix
|30||0||5.6||.276||.000||.429||1.8||.3||.1||.0||.6
|-
|style="text-align:left;"|
|style="text-align:left;"|Chicago
|46||0||10.9||.529||.000||.732||3.0||.6||.3||.1||2.3
|-
|style="text-align:left;"|
|style="text-align:left;"|Phoenix
|55||0||10.4||.464||.313||.737||2.7||.7||.4||.1||2.2
|-
|style="text-align:left;"|
|style="text-align:left;"|Phoenix
|52||4||9.7||.512||.400||.667||2.1||.7||.3||.0||3.1
|-
|style="text-align:left;"|
|style="text-align:left;"|Golden State
|30||4||7.6||.348||.318||.700||1.6||.4||.3||.0||1.5
|-
|style="text-align:left;background:#afe6ba;"|†
|style="text-align:left;"|Chicago
|11||0||7.2||.435||.200||1.000||1.5||.2||.3||.1||2.1
|- class=sortbottom
|style="text-align:center;" colspan=2|Career
|540||78||12.6||.498||.292||.684||3.3||.7||.5||.1||2.7

Playoffs

|-
|style="text-align:left;"|1984
|style="text-align:left;"|Kansas City
|2||–||9.5||1.000||–||1.000||3.0||1.0||.0||.0||3.0
|-
|style="text-align:left;"| 1988
|style="text-align:left;"|San Antonio
|2||0||18.0||.500||–||–||3.5||2.0||.5||.0||2.0
|-
|style="text-align:left;"|1989
|style="text-align:left;"|Phoenix
|4||0||1.5||.333||–||–||.8||.0||.0||.0||.5
|-
|style="text-align:left;"|1990
|style="text-align:left;"|Chicago
|15||0||15.2||.472||.000||.619||3.5||.3||.7||.1||3.1
|-
|style="text-align:left;"|1991
|style="text-align:left;"|Phoenix
|2||0||10.0||.200||.000||–||2.5||.0||.0||.0||1.0
|-
|style="text-align:left;"|1992
|style="text-align:left;"|Phoenix
|8||0||8.4||.389||.385||1.000||2.3||.5||.4||.0||2.9
|- class="sortbottom"
|style="text-align:center;" colspan=2|Career
|33||0||11.4||.441||.333||.704||2.8||.5||.4||.0||2.5

References

External links
NBA statistics at Basketball-Reference
College statistics at Sports-reference
CBA statistics at justsportsstats.com

1960 births
Living people
American men's basketball players
Basketball players from Kansas
Chicago Bulls players
Golden State Warriors players
Kansas City Kings draft picks
Kansas City Kings players
Kansas State Wildcats men's basketball players
People from Pittsburg, Kansas
Phoenix Suns players
Power forwards (basketball)
San Antonio Spurs players
Sarasota Stingers players
Tampa Bay Thrillers players